The 1949–50 Spartan League season was the 32nd in the history of Spartan League. The league consisted of 14 teams.

League table

The division featured 14 teams, 12 from last season and 2 new teams:
 Slough Centre
 Stevenage Town

References

1949–50
9